Sepand Amirsoleimani is an Iranian Comedian and actor born on December 19, 1977 in Tehran, Iran.

Biography 
Sepand Amirsoleimani started acting at the age of 5 and has acted mostly in comedy films and series. He believes that acting does not provide financial security, and that's why he was a manager in a Food court for a while in addition to his main profession.

He was also infected with Covid-19 in June 2021 and then underwent several surgeries to regain his health. His father Saeed Amirsoleimani and his sister Kamad Amirsoleimani are prominent Iranian actors.

Selected filmography
 2022: Joker (series)
 2022: Killing a Traitor
 2020: Mafia Nights (TV series)
 2019: Salman the Persian (TV series)
 2019: Zendeh Rood (TV series) as Guest
 2016: The Enigma of the Shah (TV series)
 2015: Sperm Whale
 2014: I'm just kidding (TV series)
 2011: Doctors' Building (TV series)
 2011: Ekhrajiha 3
 2010: Bitter Coffee (TV series)
 2010: Foggy Tabriz (TV series)
 2009: Man of Many Many Faces (TV series)
 2009: Ekhrajiha 2
 2007: Ekhrajiha
 2006: Nargess (TV series)
 2005: Barareh Nights (TV series)
 2002: On Tiptoes (TV series)
 2002: Bread, love and 1000 motorcycle
 1991: Like a Cloud in the Springtime

References

External links 
 

1977 births
Living people
People from Tehran
Iranian male actors
Iranian child actors
Iranian male film actors
Iranian stand-up comedians
Iranian male television actors